Sündüz Keleş is a Turkish statistician specializing in statistical methods in genomics. She is a professor of statistics and of biostatistics and medical informatics at the University of Wisconsin–Madison. Her research has included the development of the FreeHi-C system for generating synthetic Hi-C (all-versus-all chromosome conformation capture) data.

Keleş studied industrial engineering at Bilkent University, but became interested in statistics after working there on a project involving survival analysis. She then moved to the University of California, Berkeley for graduate study, working with Mark van der Laan on biostatistics. She completed her Ph.D. there in 2003, and took her faculty position at Wisconsin after completing her doctorate, with a delay of a year to do postdoctoral research on microarray analysis techniques with van der Laan and Sandrine Dudoit.

References

External links
Home page

Year of birth missing (living people)
Living people
Turkish statisticians
Women statisticians
Bilkent University alumni
University of Wisconsin–Madison faculty